Brown County (county code BR) is a county located in the northeast portion of the U.S. state of Kansas. As of the 2020 census, the county population was 9,508. Its county seat and most populous city is Hiawatha. Brown County is the location of the Kickapoo Indian Reservation of Kansas, the majority of the Sac and Fox Reservation and the majority of the Iowa Reservation of Kansas and Nebraska.

History

Early history

For many millennia, the Great Plains of North America was inhabited by nomadic Native Americans.  From the 16th century to 18th century, the Kingdom of France claimed ownership of large parts of North America.  In 1762, after the French and Indian War, France secretly ceded New France to Spain, per the Treaty of Fontainebleau.

19th century
In 1802, Spain returned most of the land to France, but keeping title to about 7,500 square miles.  In 1803, most of the land for modern day Kansas was acquired by the United States from France as part of the 828,000 square mile Louisiana Purchase for 2.83 cents per acre.

In 1854, the Kansas Territory was organized, then in 1861 Kansas became the 34th U.S. state.  Brown County was founded in 1855,  was named for Albert G. Brown.

Geography
The Wolf River has its source in the county. Brown State Fishing Lake, formerly known as "Brown County State Park" is in the county, 8 miles (13 km) east of Hiawatha.

Adjacent counties
 Richardson County, Nebraska (north)
 Doniphan County (east)
 Atchison County (southeast)
 Jackson County (southwest)
 Nemaha County (west)

Major highways
Sources:  National Atlas, U.S. Census Bureau
 U.S. Route 36
 U.S. Route 73
 U.S. Route 75
 U.S. Route 159
 Kansas Highway 20
 Kansas Highway 246

Demographics

 

As of the 2000 census, there were 10,724 people, 4,318 households, and 2,949 families residing in the county.  The population density was 19 people per square mile (7/km2).  There were 4,815 housing units at an average density of 8 per square mile (3/km2).  The racial makeup of the county was 86.87% White, 1.56% Black or African American, 8.82% Native American, 0.21% Asian, 0.01% Pacific Islander, 0.73% from other races, and 1.81% from two or more races. Hispanic or Latino of any race were 2.32% of the population.

There were 4,318 households, out of which 31.40% had children under the age of 18 living with them, 55.80% were married couples living together, 9.20% had a female householder with no husband present, and 31.70% were non-families. 28.80% of all households were made up of individuals, and 15.70% had someone living alone who was 65 years of age or older.  The average household size was 2.44 and the average family size was 2.99.

In the county, the population was spread out, with 26.40% under the age of 18, 7.40% from 18 to 24, 24.00% from 25 to 44, 22.70% from 45 to 64, and 19.50% who were 65 years of age or older.  The median age was 40 years. For every 100 females there were 93.50 males.  For every 100 females age 18 and over, there were 89.80 males.

The median income for a household in the county was $31,971, and the median income for a family was $39,525. Males had a median income of $29,163 versus $19,829 for females. The per capita income for the county was $15,163.  About 10.60% of families and 12.90% of the population were below the poverty line, including 16.40% of those under age 18 and 11.80% of those age 65 or over.

Government

Presidential elections

Like all of Kansas outside the eastern cities, Brown County is overwhelmingly Republican, although its history of Yankee settlement means it has been thus for longer than certain other parts of the state. Brown was Alf Landon’s strongest county in his home state during his disastrous 1936 presidential campaign. FDR was never to win so much as 42 percent of the vote in any of his four Presidential elections; indeed no Democratic presidential nominee has ever won a majority in Brown County, with the highest percentage being 47 percent by William Jennings Bryan in 1896. A mortally divided Republican Party allowed Woodrow Wilson to win a plurality in 1912 with under 37 percent of the county’s vote – nonetheless since 1968 no Democrat has reached even that percentage.

Laws
Following amendment to the Kansas Constitution in 1986, the county remained a prohibition, or "dry", county until 2000, when voters approved the sale of alcoholic liquor by the individual drink without a food sales requirement.

Education
Unified school districts
 Hiawatha USD 415 
 South Brown County USD 430 

School district office in neighboring county
 Doniphan West USD 111
 Prairie Hills USD 113
 North Jackson USD 335

Bureau of Indian Education-affiliated tribal schools
 Kickapoo Nation School

Communities

Cities

Everest
Fairview
Hamlin
Hiawatha
Horton
Morrill
Powhattan
Reserve
Robinson
Sabetha (partly in Nemaha County)
Willis

Census-designated places
Kickapoo Site 1
Kickapoo Site 2
Kickapoo Site 5
Kickapoo Site 6
Kickapoo Site 7
Kickapoo Tribal Center

Unincorporated communities
Baker
Fidelity
Mercier (originally called Germantown)
Padonia

Townships
Brown County is divided into ten townships.  The cities of Hiawatha, Horton, and Sabetha are considered governmentally independent and are excluded from the census figures for the townships.  In the following table, the population center is the largest city (or cities) included in that township's population total, if it is of a significant size.

See also
 National Register of Historic Places listings in Brown County, Kansas

References

Further reading

 Standard Atlas of Brown County, Kansas; Geo. A. Ogle & Co; 70 pages; 1919.
 Plat Book of Brown County, Kansas; Northwest Publishing Company; 44 pages; 1904.
 Meacham's Illustrated Atlas of Brown and Nemaha Counties, Kansas; J.H. Meacham & Company; 127 pages; 1887.

External links

County
 
 Brown County - Directory of Public Officials
Maps
 Brown County Maps: Current, Historic, KDOT
 Kansas Highway Maps: Current, Historic, KDOT
 Kansas Railroad Maps: Current, 1996, 1915, KDOT and Kansas Historical Society

 
Kansas counties
1855 establishments in Kansas Territory